Vásárosnamény is a small town in Szabolcs-Szatmár-Bereg county, in the Northern Great Plain region of eastern Hungary. It also includes Vitka since 1969, and in 1939 Gergelyi and Ugornya formed by uniting Gergelyiugornya.

Postal history
Prior to the breakup of Hungary at the end of World War I, the town was in Bereg county. The Post office was established in 1836. The postmaster began using a straight line postmark in 1839. In 1848, the post office began using the standard Hungarian double circle postmark.

References

Populated places in Szabolcs-Szatmár-Bereg County